Edward Bermingham may refer to:
 Edward Bermingham, 13th Baron Athenry (died 1709), Anglo-Irish lord
 Edward J. Bermingham (1887–1958), American investment banker